"Big Log" is a song by English recording artist Robert Plant from his second solo studio album, The Principle of Moments (1983). It was the first single from the album and became his first Top 40 solo hit, peaking at No. 11 on the UK Singles Chart and No. 20 on the US Billboard Hot 100. The song also reached No. 6 on the Billboard Top Tracks chart.  Neither of the two words in the title appears in the lyrics.

Cash Box compared the synthesized drums and claps to Marvin Gaye's "Sexual Healing" and praised Plant's vocal performance.

Bassist Viktor Krauss recorded a cover of "Big Log" on his 2004 album Far from Enough.  Krauss' sister Alison, who recorded the album Raising Sand with Plant three years later, sang lead vocals on the track.
The song is featured in Grand Theft Auto V, in-game on  the Los Santos Rock Radio station.

Music video
The music video for the song was filmed around California and Nevada, including the Amargosa Opera House and Hotel in Death Valley Junction, California, the Calico Ghost Town in California, the Glass Pool Inn in Las Vegas, and in Crystal, Nye County, Nevada and was directed by Storm Thorgerson.

Track listing
 UK 7" Single
A: "Big Log" (Plant, Blunt, Woodroffe) – 5:03
B: "Messin' with the Mekon" (Plant, Blunt, Paul Martinez) – 4:40

 US 7" Single
A: "Big Log" (Plant, Blunt, Woodroffe) – 5:03
B: "Far Post" (Plant, Blunt, Woodroffe) – 4:44

Chart performance

Weekly charts

Year-end charts

References

External links

1983 singles
Robert Plant songs
Songs written by Robert Plant
Swan Song Records singles
Songs written by Robbie Blunt
1983 songs
Atlantic Records singles